Mamady may refer to:

 Mamady, Republic of Bashkortostan, Russia

People with the given name
 Mamady Condé (fl. 2004–2007), Guinean politician and diplomat
 Mamady Keïta (1950–2021), Guinean drummer
 Mamady Sidibé (born 1979), Malian footballer
 Mamady "Wadaba" Kourouma (born 1963), Guinean drummer
 Mamady Youla (born 1961),  Prime Minister of Guinea (2015–2018)